Mitch Longley (born June 23, 1965) is an American actor. He is known for his role of Matt Harmon on the soap opera Port Charles (1997-2000).

Early life
Mitch Longley was born in Cleveland, Ohio to John and Betty, a Food Services Executive and a Surgical Nurse. He was the second child born to the family, having an older brother named Matthew. At the age of 5, his family relocated to Rowayton, Connecticut, and had his first yearnings to become an actor. As he was growing up, he performed in local plays, acting and singing. He was a student at Brien McMahon High School and was involved in various after school programs and athletics including band. He became an avid tennis player and his passion for this sport continues to the present day.

Career
Mitch attended college at Northeastern University in Boston, Massachusetts. He majored in Speech Communications with a minor in Philosophy. During his college years, he gave talks at several colleges in Boston regarding disability related issues, and sang in the Northeastern University choir. He completed internships through Northeastern such as working with disabled children in San Francisco.

After graduating in 1989, Longley returned to his hometown in Norwalk, Connecticut. In 1990, through a friend, he was able to meet the famed fashion photographer, Bruce Weber. Longley subsequently met designer, Ralph Lauren, and was hired by Lauren to be a fashion model in his ad campaigns. A director of the daytime soap opera Another World noticed Longley's modeling shots in fashion magazines, and she was interested. In 1991, he was hired for his first professional acting job, young attorney, Byron Pierce. His personality and looks, including his beautiful long flowing mane of hair, were a hit with the fans of Another World. Longley stayed at the soap for a year and then left of his own accord. For a while, he spent his time traveling. In December 1993, he permanently relocated to Southern California to pursue his acting dreams.

Primetime roles 
Longley has appeared in several television roles since his debut in 1995.

'Til Death - Joe (2009)
Desperate Housewives - Dominick (2008)
Las Vegas - Mitch Sassen (2003–2008)
Weeds - Murderball Ref (2007)
Shark - Mickey Strong (2007)
Bones - Hank Lutrell (2006)
Joan of Arcadia - Barry 'The Bear' Caldwell (2003–2004)
Judging Amy - Jonathan Ashworth (2001–2002)
The Burning Zone - Van Driver (1996)
Vanishing Son - Justin Hessling (1995)

Soap opera roles 
Longley has appeared in several soap opera roles since his debut in 1991.

Port Charles - Dr. Matthew 'Matt' Harmon (1997–2000)
General Hospital - Dr. Matthew 'Matt' Harmon (1997–1999)
Another World - Byron Pierce (1991–1992)

Awards and nominations
Soap Opera Digest Award Nominee, Favorite New Character (1998)

Personal life
On March 13, 1983, after attending a Senior class party, Mitch was involved in a serious car accident. He fell asleep at the wheel of his car a few blocks from home wrecking his car by plowing into a wall. He was 17 and a half years old when he learned he had a spinal cord injury and would be a paraplegic. While in rehabilitation, he graduated from high school and walked with the aid of braces on graduation day, accepting his diploma. Since the accident, Longley uses a wheelchair due to the accident leaving him paralyzed from the waist down.

Notes
Longley is a Passamaquoddy and Penobscot Native American.
Longley has dark brown eyes and salt and pepper hair.
Longley is the founder of the non-profit organization SOWOHO, Spirit of the Wounded Horse, Inc., which helps underprivileged Native Americans with physical disabilities.
Longley was voted Friendliest, Best Looking, and Nicest Smile, during his high school years.
Longley is a vegetarian and in his spare time he enjoys swimming, tennis, yoga, and photography.
In 1997, Longley was named one of Daytime's Most Fascinating People by Soap Opera Magazine.
Longley plays on the wheelchair tennis tournament circuit.

Quotes
My disability is a huge thing to some people, but to me it's just a personal characteristic like hair color. I'm hoping that in a few years, it won't even be an issue for me as an actor because it will be so commonplace.
I wanted to be an actor since I was a child, and my injury didn't change that.

External links
 
 
 
 

1965 births
Living people
American male soap opera actors
Northeastern University alumni
Male actors from Cleveland
People with paraplegia
Actors with disabilities
Actors from Norwalk, Connecticut